Terra Nova is a village located southwest of Glovertown on the island of Newfoundland. It was served by the Canadian National Railway in the 1950s. The population in 2006 was 68, this from a historic low of just 28 in 1996. By 2016, the population had risen to 73, down slightly from the total of 83 recorded in 2011.  There is a sizable leisure and summer population here seasonally as well as the stable permanent population. This community is a local service district, non tax district.

Terra Nova is accessible from Route 1 (Trans-Canada Highway) via Route 301 (Terra Nova Road).

Demographics 

References

Populated coastal places in Canada
Towns in Newfoundland and Labrador